Gao Hongxia  is a Chinese  football player. She was part of the Chinese team at the 1999 FIFA Women's World Cup and 2003 FIFA Women's World Cup.

International goals

References

1973 births
Living people
Chinese women's footballers
1999 FIFA Women's World Cup players
China women's international footballers
2003 FIFA Women's World Cup players
Women's association football defenders
Asian Games medalists in football
Footballers at the 2002 Asian Games
Medalists at the 2002 Asian Games
Asian Games silver medalists for China